Kushiroite is a rare mineral of the pyroxene group, with formula CaAlAlSiO6. It is the fully aluminian member. The formula of kushiroite corresponds to the molecule (or component) known as Calcium-Tschermak (Ca-Tschermak), which dominates in the composition of kushiroite. Kushiroite is an aluminium-analogue of other pyroxene-group members, davisite, esseneite, and grossmanite. It was found in a chondrite meteorite within refractory inclusions.

The mineral crystallizes in the monoclinic crystal system (space group C2/c).

References

Pyroxene group
Inosilicates
Calcium minerals
Aluminium minerals
Monoclinic minerals
Minerals in space group 15